The 1982 Amol uprising was an armed uprising against the government of Iran by the Maoist organisation Union of Iranian Communists (Sarbedaran).

Background 
The Union of Iranian Communists (Sarbedaran) or UIC(S) for short, was a Maoist organisation that adopted people's war as its line of struggle. The Amol County was chosen by UIC(S) as a revolutionary base area.

History 
1982 was an important year in the history of the UIC(S) and the history of Maoism in Iran in general. In this year the UIC(S) mobilised forces in forests around Amol and launched an armed campaign against the Islamic Republic. It organised an uprising on 25 January 1982, led by Siamak Zaim. The uprising was eventually a failure and many UIC(S) and Maoist leaders were shot. Zaim was arrested by the Revolutionary Guard after they retook Amol by force, and eventually executed in 1984 in spite of a pardon from death granted for helping end the firefight.

Aftermath 
After the failure of the uprising the UIC(S) went through a difficult period with most of its leadership and members arrested or killed. It also experienced various theoretical and political crises.

In culture 
The Little Black Fish is a 2014 Iranian film by Majid Esmaeili Parsa about Amol uprising.

See also 
 KDPI insurgency (1989–1996)
 Iraqi Partisan movement, 1979–1988
 Maoist insurgency in Turkey

References

External links 
 Iran: 32nd anniversary of the Amol uprising
 Photos of UIC(S) guerillas

1982 in Iran
Amol County
Communism in Iran
Communist rebellions
Maoism in Iran
Militant opposition to the Islamic Republic of Iran
Rebellions in Iran